
Gmina Jadów is a rural gmina (administrative district) in Wołomin County, Masovian Voivodeship, in east-central Poland. Its seat is the village of Jadów, which lies approximately 30 kilometres (19 mi) north-east of Wołomin and 50 km (31 mi) north-east of Warsaw.

Villages
Gmina Jadów contains the villages and settlements of Adampol, Borki, Borzymy, Dębe Małe, Dębe Wielkie, Dzierżanów, Iły, Jadów, Kukawki, Myszadła, Nowinki, Nowy Jadów, Nowy Jadów-Letnisko, Oble, Podbale, Podmyszadła, Sitne, Starowola, Strachów, Sulejów, Szewnica, Urle, Warmiaki, Wójty, Wólka Sulejowska, Wujówka, Wyglądały and Zawiszyn.

Neighbouring gminas
Gmina Jadów is bordered by the gminas of Korytnica, Łochów, Strachówka, Tłuszcz, Wyszków and Zabrodzie.

References

Polish official population figures 2006

Jadow
Wołomin County